Al Bidda Tower is a 43-storey commercial office building on the Doha Corniche in Al Dafna, Qatar. It was begun in 2006 and completed in 2009. The tower includes commercial space, business centres, showrooms, restaurants, art gallery, outdoor café and health club and a 1000 cars parking with direct underground access to the tower.

References 

 Al Bidda Tower at Emporis
 Al Bidda Tower at SkyscraperPage
 Al Bidda Tower at BAM International

Doha
Skyscrapers in Doha
Skyscraper office buildings
Office buildings completed in 2009